AUTomotive Open System ARchitecture (AUTOSAR) is a development partnership of automotive interested parties founded in 2003. It pursues the objective to create and establish an open and standardized software architecture for automotive electronic control units (ECUs). Goals include the scalability to different vehicle and platform variants, transferability of software, the consideration of availability and safety requirements, a collaboration between various partners, sustainable use of natural resources, and maintainability during the product lifecycle.

History 
AUTOSAR  was formed in July 2003 by Bavarian Motor Works (BMW), Robert Bosch GmbH, Continental AG, Daimler AG (formerly Daimler-Benz, then DaimlerChrysler), Siemens VDO, and Volkswagen to promote an open industry standard for automotive electrical-electronic (E/E) architecture. In November 2003, Ford Motor Company joined as a core partner, and in December, Groupe PSA (formerly PSA Peugeot Citroën) and Toyota Motor Corporation joined. The following November, General Motors also became a core partner. After Siemens VDO was acquired by Continental in February 2008, it ceased being an independent core partner.

Since 2003, AUTOSAR provided four major releases of the automotive software architecture for its classic platform and one release of acceptance tests. The work can be divided into three phases:
 Phase I (2004–2006): Basic development of the standard (releases 1.0, 2.0, 2.1)
 Phase II (2007–2009): Extension of the standard in architecture and methodology (releases 3.0, 3.1, 4.0)
 Phase III (2010–2013): Maintenance and selected improvements (releases 3.2, 4.1, 4.2)

In 2013, AUTOSAR entered a continuous working mode for its classic Platform to maintain the standard and provide selected improvements, including releases R4.2, and 1.0 of acceptance tests.

In 2016, work on the Adaptive Platform began. A first release (17-03) was published in early 2017, followed by release 17-10 in October 2017 and release 18-03 in March 2018. With release 18-10 in October 2018, major development activities were published.

In December 2020, AUTOSAR R20-11 was virtually released.

Concept and goals 
AUTOSAR provides specifications of basic software modules, defines application interfaces and builds a common development methodology based on standardized exchange format. Basic software modules made available by the AUTOSAR layered software architecture can be used in vehicles of different manufacturers and electronic components of different suppliers, thereby reducing expenditures for research and development.

Based on this principle, AUTOSAR aims to prepare for upcoming technologies.

Software architecture 
AUTOSAR uses a three-layer architecture:

 Basic Software: standardized software modules (mostly) with no explicit automotive job, but offers services needed to run the functional part of the upper software layer.
 Runtime environment (RTE): middleware which abstracts from the network topology for the inter- and intra-ECU information exchange between the application software components and between the Basic Software and the applications.
 Application Layer: application software components that interact with the runtime environment.

Methodology 
 System Configuration Description includes all system information and the information agreed between different ECUs (e.g. definition of bus signals).
 ECU extract: contains the information from the System Configuration Description needed for a specific ECU (e.g. those signals where a specific ECU has access to).
ECU Configuration Description: contains all basic software configuration information that is local to a specific ECU. Use this information to build the executable software, the code of the basic software modules and the code of the software components out of it.

Classic Platform 
The AUTOSAR classic platform is the standard for embedded real-time ECUs based on OSEK. Its main deliverable is specifications.

The architecture distinguishes between three software layers that run on a microcontroller: application, runtime environment (RTE) and basic software (BSW). The application software layer is mostly hardware independent. Communication between software components and access to BSW happens via RTE, which represents the full interface for applications.

The BSW is divided in three major layers and complex drivers: 
 Services
 Electronic control unit (ECU) abstraction
 Microcontroller abstraction

Services are divided further, into functional groups representing the infrastructure for system, memory and communication services.

One essential concept of the Classic Platform is the Virtual Functional Bus (VFB). This virtual bus is an abstract set of RTEs that are not yet deployed to specific ECUs and decouples the applications from the infrastructure. It communicates via dedicated ports, which means that the communication interfaces of the application software must be mapped to these ports. The VFB handles communication within the individual ECU and between ECUs. From an application point of view, no detailed knowledge of lower-level technologies or dependencies is required. This supports hardware-independent development and usage of application software.

The Classic Platform also enables the integration of non-AUTOSAR systems such as GENIVI, now renamed COVESA, by using the Franca Interface Definition Language (Franca IDL).

Adaptive platform 
New use-cases required the development of the adaptive platform. One example is automated driving, in the context of which the driver temporarily and/or partially transfers responsibility for driving to the vehicle. This can require communication with traffic infrastructure (e.g. traffic signs and -lights), cloud servers (e.g. to access the latest traffic information or map data), or the use of microprocessors and high-performance computing hardware for parallel processing, e.g., graphics processing units (GPUs).

Further, Car-2-X applications require interaction to vehicles and off-board systems. That means that the system has to provide secure on-board communication, support of cross-domain computing platforms, smartphone integration, integration of non-AUTOSAR systems, and so on. Also, cloud-based services will require dedicated means for security, such as secure cloud interaction and emergency vehicle preemption. They will enable remote and distributed services, such as remote diagnostics, over the air (OTA) update, repair, and exchange handling.

To support dynamic deployment of customer applications and to provide an environment for applications that require high-end computing power AUTOSAR is currently standardizing the AUTOSAR Adaptive Platform. Its core is an operating system based on the POSIX standard. The operating system can be used from the application via a subset of the POSIX according to IEEE1003.13 (namely PSE51). One of the key features of the Adaptive Platform is service-oriented communication since the Platform is based on the Service - Oriented Architecture.

Adaptive AUTOSAR is developed and written using C++ which is an object-oriented programming language. The communication protocol used for the in-vehicle networking is SOME/IP, based on Ethernet.
Two types of interfaces are available: services and application programming interfaces (APIs). The platform consists of functional clusters which are grouped in services and the AUTOSAR adaptive platform foundation.

Functional clusters:

 Assemble functions of the adaptive platform
 Define clustering of requirements specification
 Describe behavior of software platform from application and network perspective
 Do not constrain the final SW design of the architecture implementing the Adaptive Platform.

Functional clusters in AUTOSAR Adaptive Platform have to have at least one instance per (virtual) machine while services may be distributed in the in-car network.

Adaptive platform services include:

 Update and Configuration management
 State Management
 Network Management
 Diagnostics

The adaptive platform contains both specification and code. In comparison to the Classic Platform, AUTOSAR develops an implementation to shorten the validation cycle and illustrate the underlying concepts. This implementation is available to all AUTOSAR partners.

Foundation 
The purpose of the foundation standard is to enforce interoperability between the AUTOSAR platforms. The foundation contains common requirements and technical specifications (for example protocols) shared between the AUTOSAR platforms, and the common methodology.

Acceptance tests 
In 2014, acceptance tests were introduced to minimize test efforts and costs. Acceptance test Specifications are system test specifications using the specified interfaces of the respective Platform. Also, they are considering the specified behavior on the bus. They can be seen as a black box test case for a given platform function. The specification of standard acceptance tests contributes to these objectives.

Standardized application interfaces 
Standardization of functional interfaces across manufacturers and suppliers and standardization of the interfaces between the different software layers is seen as a basis for achieving the technical goals of AUTOSAR. Only by standardizing concrete interface contents in their physical and temporal representation allows achieving the needed integration compatibility.

Organization 
AUTOSAR defined six different levels of membership. The contribution of partners varies depending on the type of partnership:

 Core Partner
 Strategic Partner
 Premium Partner
 Associate Partner
 Development Partner
 Attendee

Core Partners include the founding partners BMW, Bosch, Continental, Daimler AG, Ford, General Motors, PSA Peugeot Citroën, Toyota, and Volkswagen. These companies are responsible for organization, administration and control of the AUTOSAR development partnership. Within this core, the Executive Board defines the overall strategy and roadmap. The Steering Committee manages day-to-day non-technical operations and admission of partners, public relations and contractual issues. The Chairman and Deputy of Chairman, appointed for one year, represent the Steering Committee for that purpose. The AUTOSAR Spokesperson takes over the communication with the outside world.

Strategic partners are appointed for a period of two years from the circle of Premium Partners and support the project leader team in the various technical, organizational and everyday processes. They also give new strategic inputs to the project leader round.

Premium and Development members contribute to work packages coordinated and monitored by the Project Leader Team established by the Core Partners. Associate partners are making use of the standard documents AUTOSAR has already released. Attendees are currently participating with Academic collaboration and non-commercial projects.

Vendors 

Selection of vendors, including RTOS, BSW, design tools, compiler, etc.
 Elektrobit (now part of Continental AG)
embitel
ETAS
KPIT Technologies
Siemens (previously Mentor Graphics)
Vector Informatik

AUTOSAR-related software vendors and partners 
Vendors which provide related tools and software, e.g. for testing, diagnostics, development, etc.''

 dSPACE GmbH
MATLAB by MathWorks

Competitors or related consortia 

 Automotive Grade Linux
 COMASSO Organization provides an open source AUTOSAR platform
GENIVI Alliance

See also
 Automotive SPICE (A software process assessment framework required by or relating to some specifications of AUTOSAR)
Electronic control unit (ECU)
Embedded system
ISO 26262 (Functional safety norm, required by or relating to some specifications of AUTOSAR)
List of requirements engineering tools (Tools for ARXML/MBSE modelling, such as IBM's Rhapsody)
Modeling language
MISRA
OSEK
Software architecture

References

Further reading
 

Staron, Miroslaw (2021). Automotive Software Architectures - An Introduction. Springer. .

External links 
 
AUTOSAR user groups (COMASSO, etc.)

Automotive software
Engine technology
Motor trade associations
Software architecture